Berryite is a mineral with the formula . It occurs as gray to blue-gray monoclinic prisms. It is opaque and has a metallic luster. It has a Mohs hardness of 3.5 and a specific gravity of 6.7.

It was first identified in 1965 using X-ray diffraction by mineralogist Leonard Gascoigne Berry (1914–1982). It is found in Park and San Juan counties in Colorado. It occurs in sulfide bearing quartz veins in Colorado and with siderite-rich cryolite in Ivigtut, Greenland.

References 

Webmineral data
Mindat with location data
Mineral Data Publishing - PDF

Lead minerals
Silver minerals
Copper(I) minerals
Bismuth minerals
Sulfosalt minerals
Monoclinic minerals
Minerals in space group 11